Turns and Strokes is a live compilation album by English rock band Wire. It was released in May 1996, consisting of various live recordings and rehearsal tapes from 1979 and 1980 with versions of previously unavailable songs, as well as two cuts from the band's EP release. In some ways, it can be considered a follow-up to the band's 1981 release Document and Eyewitness. The album cover, which features a saltire, was originally the cover for the band's 1983 single "Crazy About Love".

Track listing

Personnel 

 Wire
 Bruce Gilbert – guitar
 Robert Gotobed – drums
 Graham Lewis – bass guitar, vocals
 Colin Newman – guitar, vocals

 Production
 Denis Blackham – mastering
 Dave Coppenhall – design
 Kevin S. Eden – liner notes
 Bruce Gilbert – design
 Steve Parker – engineer
 Annette Wakefield – photography
 Dennis Weinreich – engineering

References

External links 
 

Wire (band) compilation albums
1996 compilation albums